Tso Wo Hang is a village in Sai Kung District, Hong Kong.

Administration
Tso Wo Hang is a recognized village under the New Territories Small House Policy.

References

External links

 Delineation of area of existing village Tsiu Hang (Sai Kung) for election of resident representative (2019 to 2022)

Villages in Sai Kung District, Hong Kong